Evan Lloyd Tanner (February 11, 1971 – September 5, 2008) was an American professional mixed martial arts fighter. He was a former UFC Middleweight Champion and was the first American to win the Pancrase Neo-Blood tournament in Tokyo, Japan.

Tanner won the UFC Middleweight Championship at UFC 51, stopping David Terrell with strikes in the first round. He is considered a pioneer in the sport of MMA and one of the first fighters to use elbows as an effective striking method in the ground and pound position.

Tanner is considered to be somewhat of an anomaly in MMA as he began his professional career with a large degree of success despite primarily learning the sport via instructional videotape. He was also one of the first MMA fighters to use social media as a platform to connect with fans.

Tanner earned notable career victories over former UFC Welterweight Champion Robbie Lawler, former King of Pancrase Middleweight and Welterweight Champion Kiuma Kunioku, Heath Herring, Paul Buentello, Phil Baroni (x2) and Ikuhisa Minowa, among others.

Background 
Tanner was born in Amarillo, Texas, and graduated in 1989 from Caprock High School, where he won the Texas state championship in wrestling as a junior and senior despite only entering the sport in his second year of high school. He attended Simpson College in Iowa, but dropped out when he was 19. He worked various jobs around the country as a bouncer, cable television contractor, framer building beach houses, dishwasher, baker, ditch digger, and slaughterhouse worker. He attended the University of Oklahoma for one semester before returning to Amarillo, where he entered a mixed martial arts tournament.

During his UFC career, Tanner lived in Portland, Oregon and Las Vegas, Nevada. In 2008, he relocated to Oceanside, California.

Mixed martial arts career

Early career 
Tanner, with a wrestling background, began fighting in 1997 when he was convinced by friends to enter a local MMA tournament hosted by the now defunct Unified Shoot Wrestling Federation. He won the tournament by defeating three fighters in one night, including future UFC heavyweight contender Paul Buentello.

After his initial success, Tanner taught himself submission and grappling techniques using instructional videos created by the famous Gracie family. He continued to fight in local shows and tournaments in Texas and Iowa before traveling to Japan to compete in the Pancrase organization. He won five fights overseas and competed in the USWF once more before being asked to join the UFC.

Tanner made his UFC debut in 1999 at UFC 18, submitting fellow Amarillo native Darrell Gholar by rear naked choke in the first round. His next UFC fight was at UFC 19 against Valerie Ignatov, who was known for leg submissions. Because of this, Tanner decided to fight barefoot for the first time in his career.

Tanner fought once more in Pancrase and defended his title two more times in the USWF before deciding to take the first of multiple breaks from fighting in his career. He returned in July 2000 and remained undefeated in the USWF, successfully defending his heavyweight belt with wins against Raoul Romero and Vinny Nixon. His next appearance was at UFC 29, where he defeated Lance Gibson by TKO.

A new outlook on fighting 
With three victories in the UFC, Tanner received a title shot against UFC light heavyweight champion Tito Ortiz at UFC 30. He was knocked unconscious 32 seconds into the first round by a high level slam by Ortiz.

Tanner was invited to compete in the −88 kg division at the 2001 ADCC Submission Wrestling World Championship April 11–13, 2001 at the Abu Dhabi Combat Club in Abu Dhabi, United Arab Emirates. He was defeated by Sanae Kikuta on points (6–0) in the first round.

Tanner began training with Oregon-based Team Quest. He returned to the Octagon at UFC 34, defeating Homer Moore in the second round with an armbar. At UFC 36, he defeated Elvis Sinosic by TKO (cut). At UFC 38, he won a unanimous decision over Chris Haseman in an undercard bout. At UFC 42, he lost to Rich Franklin by TKO (strikes) in the first round. After his defeat by Franklin, Tanner moved to the middleweight division, where he would be more physically imposing than many of the opponents.

Baroni I and II 
Tanner faced Phil Baroni in consecutive fights at UFC 45 and UFC 48. In the early minutes of their fight at UFC 45, Baroni was in control, but Tanner took Baroni to the ground and landed a series of unanswered punches and elbows. After a brief verbal exchange between Baroni and referee Larry Landless, the fight was stopped and Tanner was awarded the victory. Immediately after the fight, Baroni contended that he did not submit and in the confusion struck Landless twice in the face. Baroni maintained that it was a verbal miscommunication and he never asked for the fight to be stopped. To quell the controversy, the UFC agreed to give Baroni a rematch at UFC 48, which Tanner won.

Road to the UFC Middleweight title 
Tanner defeated Robbie Lawler at UFC 50 in October 2004, submitting Lawler with a triangle choke. Afterward, Tanner began training on his own.

He fought for the vacant UFC middleweight championship against David Terrell at UFC 51 in February 2005. He defeated Terrell to become the first UFC middleweight champion since Murilo Bustamante held the title before leaving for PRIDE Fighting Championships in 2002.

Tanner fought Franklin again at UFC 53 in June 2005. Franklin won when the fight was stopped by the ringside doctor due to multiple cuts and swelling on Tanner's face. With the win, Franklin was named as a coach for The Ultimate Fighter 2 reality television show, along with then UFC Welterweight champion Matt Hughes. While Franklin and Hughes did not fight at the conclusion of the show, Hughes said he would have challenged Tanner for the UFC middleweight title if Tanner had been a coach on the show.

After losing the title, Tanner began training with American Top Team, but lost his next fight to David Loiseau at Ultimate Fight Night 2 in October 2005. Tanner was ahead on points until the fight was stopped in the second round due to a cut received from a Loiseau elbow.

Shortly after this fight, Tanner appeared as himself on an episode of Beyond the Glory on  FOX Sports  that chronicled the history of the UFC. He also became a member of the Chute Boxe team.

Tanner returned to the UFC in April 2006 at UFC 59, defeating Justin Levens in what was Tanner's last victory in MMA. Levens was a late replacement for Jeremy Horn, who was forced to withdraw after a training injury.

2006–08 
On December 29, 2006, Tanner unveiled plans to set up a mixed martial arts training camp at his house in Gresham, Oregon for disadvantaged athletes and young men at risk. In February 2007, he announced that 12 athletes would reside in the house from six different weight classes. In a March 2007 interview with MMA Weekly, Tanner was asked about the possibility of fighting again, but said he wanted to focus on developing his foundation. He said he would be training year-round with the athletes he was coaching and that it might only be a matter of time before he returned. UFC president Dana White was interviewed by CBS Sportsline one week later and said Tanner would be welcomed back whenever he was ready.

On May 11, 2007, further foundation development was put on hold by Tanner, citing his own training and a bad experience with the first fighter that was invited to the house. Tanner announced through his official website that he would return to active competition and attempt to regain the UFC middleweight title.

Speculation arose that Tanner would return to the UFC in December 2007 at UFC 79 against Dean Lister. Tanner dismissed the report as he was battling an alcohol addiction. He left Chute Boxe and began training at Hard Knocks Kickboxing in Las Vegas.

On November 8, 2007, Tanner announced the signing of a four-fight deal with the UFC. He chose to accept no corporate sponsorships and instead started "Team Tanner," an exclusive fan club for his upcoming fights.

His first fight back in the UFC was at UFC 82, where he lost to Japanese fighter Yushin Okami by knockout in the second round.

In what would be his final fight, Tanner lost to Kendall Grove in a split decision at The Ultimate Fighter 7 Finale on June 21, 2008, the fifth loss in his last ten fights. In a post-match interview, he said he felt "flat" throughout the fight and that he had begun wondering if his two years of serious alcohol abuse had damaged his body past the point of which he could compete at the level he once had.

Death 
In the summer of 2008, Tanner announced plans for a solo trip to the Imperial County, California desert. After concerns were raised, he responded on August 27, 2008. "It seems some MMA (Mixed Martial Arts) websites have reported on the story, posting up that I might die out in the desert, or that it might be my greatest opponent yet, etc. Come on, guys. It's really common down in Southern California to go out to the off-road recreation areas in the desert about an hour away from LA and San Diego. So my plan is to go out to the desert, do some camping, ride the motorcycle, and shoot some guns. Sounds like a lot of fun to me. A lot of people do it. This isn't a version of 'Into the Wild.'"

He purchased a dirt bike and on September 3, 2008, rode into the desert region west of Palo Verde, California to go camping. According to his manager, John Hayner, Tanner called that afternoon to say that his bike had run out of gas and that he would walk back to his camp. This conflicted with a later report that his bike was found at his camp. He reportedly intended to refill his water bottles at Clapp Spring before heading back to his campsite, but was unaware that the spring was usually dry. Temperatures that day reached 118 °F (48 °C), but in a text message to a friend, he said he thought he could make it back to his camp if he traveled during the later hours of the evening. He told friends to contact authorities if they did not hear from him by the following morning.

When friends did not hear from him the next morning, they reported Tanner missing and a search was begun. His body was discovered near Clapp Spring with empty water bottles by a Marine helicopter on September 8, 2008. The Imperial County coroner determined the time of death to be between late September 4 and early September 5, but the legal date of death was recorded as September 8, 2008. According to a military article, Tanner's motorcycle was at his camp and within his provisions were ample supplies of water. The Imperial County sheriff's office gave an official cause of death as heat exposure.

Aftermath 

A celebration of life service was held in Amarillo, Texas on September 27. An informal gathering was held at a friend's house in Oceanside and attended by Tanner's sister and close friends. At dusk, a candlelight vigil was held.

The UFC honored Tanner during the Spike TV broadcast of UFC Fight Night: Diaz vs. Neer on September 17, 2008. Pancrase paid tribute to Tanner with a special ceremony during their 15th Anniversary Show on October 1, 2008. Shark Fights also honored Tanner during their inaugural event at the Amarillo National Center on October 24, 2008. The 2008 World MMA Awards show on December 31, 2008, in Las Vegas was dedicated to Tanner's memory.

A documentary about Tanner's life, travels and philosophy, "Once I Was A Champion," was directed by Gerard Roxburgh and premiered in competition at the 2011 Los Angeles Film Festival as an official selection. It was nominated for "Best Documentary Feature" . The film was also an official selection at the 2011 Dallas Video Festival and the inaugural Arclight Documentary Film Festival in November 2011. It won the "Best Documentary Audience Award" at the 2011 Bel Air Film Festival. In March 2014, English film director and producer Bobby Razak released a documentary about Tanner titled "1" which looked at the circumstances surrounding Tanner's death. On June 19, 2019, Variety reported that a biopic about Tanner's life and career titled "The Power of 1" was in the works, slated to go into pre-production at the end of 2019 with principal photography planned for early 2020.

Championships and accomplishments

Mixed Martial Arts 

 Pancrase Hybrid Wrestling
 1998 Pancrase Neo Blood Tournament Winner
 First non-Japanese fighter to win the Pancrase Neo Blood Tournament
 First American to win the Pancrase Neo Blood Tournament
 Second oldest fighter to win the Pancrase Neo Blood Tournament
 First and only fighter to win the Pancrase Neo Blood Tournament and a UFC Championship
 Fourth fighter to win the Pancrase Neo Blood Tournament
 First non-King of Pancrase titleholder to win a UFC Championship
 Sixth Pancrase fighter to win a UFC Championship

 Ultimate Fighting Championship
 UFC Middleweight Championship (One time)
 Fight of the Night (twice)
 Submission of the Night (once)
 Fourth highest significant strike percentage in UFC history (minimum 10 UFC bouts)
 Third fighter to win the UFC Middleweight Championship
 First fighter to win a vacant UFC Middleweight Championship
 First and only fighter from the state of Texas to win a UFC Championship
 First and only fighter from the state of Texas to win the UFC Middleweight Championship
 Fought for UFC Light Heavyweight Championship (UFC 30)
 First UFC Light Heavyweight Title Challenger to win the UFC Middleweight Championship
 Second UFC Light Heavyweight Title Challenger to win a UFC Championship
 Ranked as #1 contender in UFC Light Heavyweight and Middleweight divisions
 Headlined three UFC events (UFC 30, UFC Ultimate Fight Night 2, The Ultimate Fighter: Team Rampage vs. Team Forrest Finale)
 Featured in four UFC video games (Ultimate Fighting Championship (video game), UFC: Throwdown, UFC: Tapout 2, UFC 2009 Undisputed)
 The Ultimate Fighter 2 Coaching Finalist

 Unified Shoot Wrestling Federation
 USWF Heavyweight Championship (One time)
 Seven successful title defenses
 First and only USWF Heavyweight Champion
 Undefeated in USWF (11–0)
 Headlined seven USWF events
 Won single night, eight-man heavyweight tournament (USWF 4)
 Served as President of USWF (February 2000 through April 2003)

 Extreme Challenge
 Won single night, four-man heavyweight tournament (Gladiators 2)

MMA Hall of Fame
MMA Hall of Fame Class of 2007
MMA Freak
MMA Freak Hall of Fame Class of 2015
MMA World Rankings
MMA World Rankings Hall of Fame Class of 2008
Five Ounces of Pain
Making the case for Evan Tanner to be inducted into the UFC Hall of Fame
 Sherdog
MMA's Greats of the States | Texas
Imagining an MMA Hall of Fame: Borderline Candidates
The Top 10 Stories of the 2000s | #8: The Death of Evan Tanner
Sherdog's Top 10 UFC Middleweight Title Fights | Honorable Mention: Evan Tanner vs. David Terrell (UFC 51)
Sherdog's Top 10 UFC Middleweight Title Fights | Honorable Mention: Evan Tanner vs. Rich Franklin (UFC 53)
Sherdog's Top 10 UFC Light Heavyweight Title Fights  | Honorable Mention: Tito Ortiz vs. Evan Tanner (UFC 30)
Sherdog's Top 10 Middleweights of All-Time | Honorable Mention: Evan Tanner
Sherdog.com 2005 Upset of the Year Nominee: Evan Tanner def. David Terrell
 ESPN
A look at 100 memorable UFC fights | #41: Evan Tanner vs. David Terrell
A look at 100 memorable UFC fights | #44: Rich Franklin vs. Evan Tanner
A look at 100 memorable UFC fights | #58: Tito Ortiz vs. Evan Tanner
 Yahoo Sports
UFC's 20 greatest fighters a mix of old and new | #18: Evan Tanner

 Wrestling Observer Newsletter
1998 Rookie of the Year Nominee
1998 Shooter of the Year Nominee
 Fight Matrix
All-Time MMA Rankings | #22 (Middleweight): Evan Tanner

Amateur Wrestling 
  Texas University Interscholastic League
 1988 UIL State Champion (167 lbs)
 1989 UIL State Champion (167 lbs)

Submission Grappling 
  ADCC 
 Competed in the −88 kg division at the 2001 ADCC Submission Wrestling World Championship

Mixed martial arts record 

| Loss
| align=center| 32–8
| Kendall Grove
| Decision (split)
| The Ultimate Fighter: Team Rampage vs. Team Forrest Finale
| 
| align=center| 3
| align=center| 5:00
| Las Vegas, Nevada, United States
|
|-
| Loss
| align=center| 32–7
| Yushin Okami
| KO (knee)
| UFC 82
| 
| align=center| 2
| align=center| 3:00
| Columbus, Ohio, United States
| 
|-
| Win
| align=center| 32–6
| Justin Levens
| Submission (triangle choke)
| UFC 59: Reality Check
| 
| align=center| 1
| align=center| 3:14
| Anaheim, California, United States
| 
|-
| Loss
| align=center| 31–6
| David Loiseau
| TKO (doctor stoppage)
| UFC Ultimate Fight Night 2
| 
| align=center| 2
| align=center| 4:15
| Las Vegas, Nevada, United States
| 
|-
| Loss
| align=center| 31–5
| Rich Franklin
| TKO (doctor stoppage)
| UFC 53
| 
| align=center| 4
| align=center| 3:25
| Atlantic City, New Jersey, United States
| 
|-
| Win
| align=center| 31–4
| David Terrell
| TKO (punches)
| UFC 51
| 
| align=center| 1
| align=center| 4:35
| Las Vegas, Nevada, United States
| 
|-
| Win
| align=center| 30–4
| Robbie Lawler
| Submission (triangle choke)
| UFC 50
| 
| align=center| 1
| align=center| 2:22
| Atlantic City, New Jersey, United States
| 
|-
| Win
| align=center| 29–4
| Phil Baroni
| Decision (unanimous)
| UFC 48
| 
| align=center|  3
| align=center|  5:00
| Las Vegas, Nevada, United States
| 
|-
| Win
| align=center| 28–4
| Phil Baroni
| TKO (punches)
| UFC 45
| 
| align=center| 1
| align=center| 4:42
| Uncasville, Connecticut, United States
| 
|-
| Loss
| align=center| 27–4
| Rich Franklin
| TKO (punches)
| UFC 42
| 
| align=center| 1
| align=center| 2:40
| Miami, Florida, United States
|
|-
| Win
| align=center| 27–3
| Shannon Ritch
| Submission (triangle choke)
| FCFF-Fighting Against Cancer
| 
| align=center| 1
| align=center| 2:19
| Portland, Oregon, United States
|
|-
| Win
| align=center| 26–3
| Chris Haseman
| Decision (unanimous)
| UFC 38
| 
| align=center| 3
| align=center| 5:00
| London, England
|
|-
| Win
| align=center| 25–3
| Elvis Sinosic
| TKO (doctor stoppage)
| UFC 36
| 
| align=center| 1
| align=center| 2:06
| Las Vegas, Nevada, United States
|
|-
| Win
| align=center| 24–3
| Homer Moore
| Submission (armbar)
| UFC 34
| 
| align=center| 2
| align=center| 0:55
| Las Vegas, Nevada, United States
|
|-
| Loss
| align=center| 23–3
| Tito Ortiz
| KO (slam)
| UFC 30
| 
| align=center| 1
| align=center| 0:30
| East Rutherford, New Jersey, United States
| 
|-
| Win
| align=center| 23–2
| Lance Gibson
| TKO (punches and elbows)
| UFC 29
| 
| align=center| 1
| align=center| 4:48
| Tokyo, Japan
|
|-
| Win
| align=center| 22–2
| Travis Fulton
| Submission (triangle choke)
| Unified Shoot Wrestling Federation 18
| 
| align=center| 1
| align=center| 4:38
| Amarillo, Texas, United States
| 
|-
| Win
| align=center| 21–2
| Raoul Romero
| TKO (punches)
| Unified Shoot Wrestling Federation 17
| 
| align=center| 1
| align=center| 6:59
| Amarillo, Texas, United States
| 
|-
| Win
| align=center| 20–2
| Vinny Nixon
| Submission (keylock)
| Unified Shoot Wrestling Federation 14
| 
| align=center| 1
| align=center| 1:07
| Lubbock, Texas, United States
| 
|-
| Loss
| align=center| 19–2
| Leon Dijk
| TKO (knees and palm strikes)
| Pancrase: Breakthrough 4
| 
| align=center| 1
| align=center| 11:39
| Yokohama, Japan
|
|-
| Win
| align=center| 19–1
| Mike Cizek
| TKO (submission to punches)
| Unified Shoot Wrestling Federation 13
| 
| align=center| 1
| align=center| 2:06
| Amarillo, Texas, United States
| 
|-
| Win
| align=center| 18–1
| Valeri Ignatov
| TKO (elbows)
| UFC 19
| 
| align=center| 1
| align=center| 2:58
| Bay St. Louis, Mississippi, United States
|
|-
| Win
| align=center| 17–1
| Darrel Gholar
| Submission (rear-naked choke)
| UFC 18
| 
| align=center| 1
| align=center| 7:57
| New Orleans, Louisiana, United States
| 
|-
| Win
| align=center| 16–1
| Ryushi Yanagisawa
| Submission (arm-triangle choke)
| Pancrase: Advance 12
| 
| align=center| 1
| align=center| 2:24
| Chiba, Japan
|
|-
| Win
| align=center| 15–1
| Gene Lydick
| Submission (rear-naked choke)
| Unified Shoot Wrestling Federation 12
| 
| align=center| 1
| align=center| 4:15
| Amarillo, Texas, United States
| 
|-
| Win
| align=center| 14–1
| Kiuma Kunioku
| Decision (lost points)
| Pancrase: 1998 Anniversary Show
| 
| align=center| 1
| align=center| 20:00
| Tokyo, Japan
|
|-
| Win
| align=center| 13–1
| Justin McCully
| Technical Submission (kimura)
| Pancrase: 1998 Neo-Blood Tournament Second Round
| 
| align=center| 1
| align=center| 5:07
| Tokyo, Japan
| 
|-
| Win
| align=center| 12–1
| Kousei Kubota
| Submission (arm-triangle choke)
| rowspan=2|Pancrase: 1998 Neo-Blood Tournament Opening Round
| rowspan=2|
| align=center| 1
| align=center| 2:23
| rowspan=2|Tokyo, Japan
| 
|-
| Win
| align=center| 11–1
| Ikuhisa Minowa
| Submission (arm-triangle choke)
| align=center| 1
| align=center| 4:05
| 
|-
| Win
| align=center| 10–1
| Tony Castillo
| TKO (knees)
| Unified Shoot Wrestling Federation 9
| 
| align=center| 1
| align=center| 4:06
| Amarillo, Texas, United States
| 
|-
| Win
| align=center| 9–1
| Dennis Reed
| Submission (triangle choke)
| rowspan=2|Gladiators 2
| rowspan=2|
| align=center| 1
| align=center| 1:20
| rowspan=2|Iowa, United States
| 
|-
| Win
| align=center| 8–1
| Wade Kroeze
| TKO (knees)
| align=center| 1
| align=center| 1:00
| 
|-
| Win
| align=center| 7–1
| Rusty Totty
| Submission (arm-triangle choke)
| Unified Shoot Wrestling Federation 8
| 
| align=center| 1
| align=center| 1:36
| Amarillo, Texas, United States
| 
|-
| Loss
| align=center| 6–1
| Heath Herring
| Submission (rear-naked choke)
| rowspan=3|PSDA
| rowspan=3|
| align=center| 1
| align=center| 8:20
| rowspan=3|Texas, United States
| 
|-
| Win
| align=center| 6–0
| Jesse Gonzalez
| Submission (ezekiel choke)
| align=center| 1
| align=center| 1:15
| 
|-
| Win
| align=center| 5–0
| Joe Frailey
| TKO (submission to punches)
| align=center| 1
| align=center| 0:56
| 
|-
| Win
| align=center| 4–0
| Heath Herring
| TKO (exhaustion)
| Unified Shoot Wrestling Federation 7
| 
| align=center| 1
| align=center| 6:19
| Amarillo, Texas, United States
| 
|-
| Win
| align=center| 3–0
| Paul Buentello
| Submission (rear-naked choke)
| rowspan=3|Unified Shoot Wrestling Federation 4
| rowspan=3|
| align=center| 1
| align=center| 2:20
| rowspan=3|Amarillo, Texas, United States
| 
|-
| Win
| align=center| 2–0
| Gary Nabors
| Submission (keylock)
| align=center| 1
| align=center| 2:21
| 
|-
| Win
| align=center| 1–0
| Mike Kennedy
| TKO (submission to palm strikes)
| align=center| 1
| align=center| 1:29
|

References 

 Evan Tanner's myspace page. myspace.com. Retrieved on November 28, 2006.
 Evan Tanner's fight record courtesy of Sherdog. Sherdog.com. Retrieved on November 28, 2006.
 Evan Tanner Fighter Info. MMAforum.com. Retrieved on November 28, 2006.
 Evan Tanner Interview 6/30/06. MMA365. Retrieved on November 28, 2006.
 UFC Fighter Page UFC.com. Retrieved November 28, 2006.
 Evan Tanner Fighter Profile. Ultimate-fighter.ca. Retrieved on November 28, 2006.
 Evan Tanner Interview. ufighting.com. Retrieved on November 28, 2006.
 Team Quest: As Iron Sharpens Iron. Boxing Insider. Retrieved on December 3, 2006.
 Postal Connections: The Reason Evan Tanner Left Team Quest. Real Fight Gear. Retrieved on December 3, 2006.
 Evan Tanner Post-UFC 59 Video Interview. Sherdog. Retrieved on December 3, 2006.
 Sherdog.com Preview: UFC 59 "Reality Check" Part I Sherdog. Retrieved on December 3, 2006.
 Tanner Pays Dues to Rake in Profits Sherdog. Retrieved on December 3, 2006.
 From Common Competitor to Middleweight Monarch Sherdog. Retrieved on December 3, 2006.
 Jeff Cain. Breaking The Silence MMA Weekly. Retrieved on December 3, 2006.
 Marc Wickert This Fight is Wide Open Knuckle Pit. Retrieved on December 18, 2006.
 Marc Wickert The Desert Warrior Knuckle Pit. Retrieved on December 18, 2006.
 Marc Wickert UFC's Lone Wolf Knuckle Pit. Retrieved on December 18, 2006.
 Mick Hammond Evan Tanner Returns With A New Vision MMA Weekly. Retrieved on March 18, 2007.
 Sam Caplan Five Ounces of Pain CBS Sportsline. Retrieved on March 18, 2007.
  Kenny and Ozone Show. Retrieved on November 8, 2007.

External links 
 Official Site
 Official Blog
 MySpace
 Obituary
 Official site of documentary on Tanner's life
 
 

Accidental deaths in California
American male mixed martial artists
Middleweight mixed martial artists
Mixed martial artists utilizing wrestling
Mixed martial artists utilizing Brazilian jiu-jitsu
Sportspeople from Amarillo, Texas
Sportspeople from Gresham, Oregon
American practitioners of Brazilian jiu-jitsu
People awarded a black belt in Brazilian jiu-jitsu
Ultimate Fighting Championship male fighters
Ultimate Fighting Championship champions
American male sport wrestlers
Amateur wrestlers
Deaths from hyperthermia
1971 births
2008 deaths